Sonubhau dagadu Baswant (10 February 1915 – 16 December 1987) was a member of the 4th Lok Sabha of India from  the Thane constituency of Maharashtra and a member of the Indian National Congress (INC) political party. He was also member of 3rd Lok Sabha from Thane.

Born in Khutghar, Shahpur Thane district, he was married to Parwatibai and resided at Shahpur in Thane district. He was an agriculturist and member of the Thana District Development Board from 1952 through 1959, a member of  A.I.C.C from 1964 through 1967, and a member of the Maharashtra State Forest Development Board and Maharashtra Development Co-operative Union. He was President of the Thana District Congress Committee from 1959 through 1964, the Ambernath  Ordnance  Factory  National Employees Union, the Thana District  P.W.D., and the Zilla Parishad  Road  Workers Union since 1964. He has been chairman of the Shahapur Taluka  Co-operative Milk Production Union since 1963.

References

External links
 Official biographical sketch in Parliament of India website

1915 births
1987 deaths
India MPs 1967–1970
India MPs 1962–1967
Marathi politicians
People from Bhiwandi
People from Shahapur
Lok Sabha members from Maharashtra
Maharashtra district councillors
People from Thane district
Indian National Congress politicians from Maharashtra